Zaganella and the Cavalier (Italian: Zaganella e il cavaliere) is a 1932 Italian comedy film directed by Giorgio Mannini and Gustavo Serena and starring Arturo Falconi, Marcella Albani and Carlo Lombardi. It is also known as Zaganella and the Honorable Gentleman.

Cast
 Arturo Falconi as Il cavaliere Pidagna / Il vetturino Zaganella  
 Marcella Albani as Lia, la sua figlia  
 Carlo Lombardi as Ignazio Meli  
 Maria Wronska as Elsa Moro, la cantante  
 Olga Capri as Donna Mara  
 Vasco Creti as Il notaio Scafiti  
 Guido Riccioli as Balata  
 Claudio Ermelli as Carru Iongu  
 Giuseppe Pierozzi
 Oreste Bilancia 
 Umberto Sacripante
 Pino Locchi as Robertino  
 Silvana Mussone as Agatina

References

Bibliography 
 Goble, Alan. The Complete Index to Literary Sources in Film. Walter de Gruyter, 1999.
 Moliterno, Gino. Historical Dictionary of Italian Cinema. Scarecrow Press, 2008.

External links 
 

1932 comedy films
Italian comedy films
1932 films
1930s Italian-language films
Films directed by Gustavo Serena
Italian black-and-white films
1930s Italian films